Ceratophysa ceratopyga is a species of sea urchins of the Family Pourtalesiidae. Their armour is covered with spines. Ceratophysa ceratopyga was first scientifically described in 1879 by Alexander Emanuel Agassiz.

See also 

 Centrostephanus sylviae
 Centrostephanus tenuispinus
 Ceratophysa rosea

References 

Animals described in 1879
Holasteroida